Baptist successionism (or Baptist perpetuity) is one of several theories on the origin and continuation of Baptist churches. The theory postulates an unbroken lineage of churches (since the days of John the Baptist, who baptized Christ) which have held beliefs similar to those of current Baptists. Groups often included in this lineage include the Montanists, Paulicians, Cathari, Waldenses, Albigenses, Lollards, and Anabaptists. However most scholars agree that the Baptists originated within 17th-century puritanism.

Theory 

The theory proposes that Baptists have an unbroken lineage from the early church, while claiming that over time bishops or pastors started to assume more authority which led to the Catholic church being born and which led to errors.

Groups often included in the succession line are Montanists, Novationists, Donatists, Paulicians, Albigenses, Waldenses, Petro-Brussians, Arnoldists, Henricians, Hussites (partly), Lollards and Ana-Baptists.

Supporters of the theory argue that groups such as Bogomils or Paulicians were Baptist in doctrine instead of Gnostic,  with, for example, Berlin Hisel arguing that many charges put towards Bogomils were false.

Novatians 
Hisel claimed that the Novatians were credobaptists and accepted rebaptism. 

Though Augustine mentions that the Novatians rebaptized converts, the evidence for them being credobaptist has been called "weak".

Paulicians 
Berlin Hisel argued against the accusations put towards the Paulicians, such as rejection of the writings of Peter the Apostle and the Old Testament, and argued that the Paulicians held to the orthodox view of the Trinity, a reason for the denial of many charges towards Paulicians was that the sources we have were made by their opponents. It was also put forward that the Paulicians believed in Believer's baptism along with the Bogomils.

Bogomils 
Hisel claimed that the charges of rejecting baptism likely meant a rejection of infant baptism and trine-immersion, which could have been taken as rejection of baptism itself, since the sources that exist about Bogomilism are from people who opposed them, and thus he argued that these sources should be taken with suspicion.

Albigenses 

Hisel further argued that the claim of the Albigenses rejecting marriage likely only meant rejecting marriage as a sacrament.

It was also argued that they rejected infant baptism and baptismal regeneration.

Waldensians 
Hisel stated in his book that; the Albigenses and Waldensians are connected directly in origin, and thus followed similar doctrine.

Arnoldists 
Hisel made the case that the Arnoldists were baptist in doctrine, as evidence the Lateran council is quoted where Arnold of Brescia was condemned for rejecting infant baptism and for the rejection of transubstantiation. A direct connection with Arnoldists and Waldensians was also claimed to support succession, a direct link was also argued with Arnoldists and Petro-Brussians.

Anabaptists 
In the book Baptist History Notebook, to support a succession, Mosheim (a lutheran historian) is quoted as saying; "The true origin of that sect which acquired the denomination of Anabaptists by their administering anew the rite of baptism to those who came over to their communion, and derived that of Mennonites from the famous man to whom they owe the greatest part of their present felicity, is hidden in the depths of antiquity, and is, of consequence, extremely difficult to be ascertained". It was thus argued that the Anabaptists have a succession from earlier groups such as Waldenses.

Perpetuity 
The perpetuity view is often identified with The Trail of Blood, a pamphlet by James Milton Carroll published in 1931. Other Baptist writers who held the perpetuity view are John T. Christian, Thomas Crosby, G. H. Orchard, J. M. Cramp, William Cathcart, Adam Taylor and D. B. Ray.
	
This view was once commonly held among Baptists. Since the end of the 19th century, however, the theory has increasingly come under attack and today has been largely discredited. Nonetheless, the view continued to be the prevailing view among Baptists of the Southern United States into the latter 20th century. It is now identified primarily with Landmarkism, which is upheld by the Independent Fundamental Baptist movement, though not exclusively so. The concept attempts to parallel the Roman Catholic, Eastern Orthodox, and Anglican doctrine of apostolic succession and stands in contrast to the restorationist views of Latter Day Saints and the Stone-Campbell Restoration Movement.

Contemporary view 
	
Since the end of the 19th century the trend in academic Baptist historiography has been away from the successionist viewpoint to the view that modern day Baptists are an outgrowth of 17th-century English Separatism. This shift precipitated a controversy among Southern Baptists which occasioned the forced resignation of William H. Whitsitt, a professor at Southern Baptist Seminary, in 1898 from the seminary for advocating the new view, though his views continued to be taught in the seminary after his departure.

See also 

Landmarkism
Restorationism

The Pilgrim Church by Edmund Hamer Broadbent
Proto-Protestantism

References

Citations

Works cited 

 
 
 
 
 
 

History of Baptists
Christian terminology
Pseudohistory